General elections were held in Kenya Colony in 1934, with the first seats elected on 28 March. Four candidates were returned unopposed in the eleven Europeans constituencies, whilst the remaining seven constituencies were contested by 18 candidates. For the five Indian seats, there were 17 candidates. Voter turnout in the White seats was the highest since elections were introduced. The Council convened for the first time after the election on 24 April.

Electoral system
The Legislative Council consisted of eleven ex-officio members, eight appointed government officials, two members appointed to represent the interests of the African community, one member appointed to represent the Arab community, and seventeen elected members.

Of the seventeen elected seats, eleven were for Europeans, five for Indians and one for Arabs. Around 6,000-7,000 Europeans were registered to vote in the eleven constituencies.

Results

Appointed members

Aftermath
The newly elected Legislative Council met for the first time on 24 April.

References

1934 elections in Africa
1934 in Kenya
1934
Legislative Council of Kenya
1934
March 1934 events